Court Martial is a 1959 West German war drama film directed by Kurt Meisel and starring Karlheinz Böhm, Christian Wolff and Hans Nielsen. It was entered into the 1959 Cannes Film Festival. The film's sets were designed by the art director Ernst H. Albrecht.

Cast

References

Bibliography

External links

1959 films
1959 drama films
1950s war drama films
German war drama films
1950s German-language films
German black-and-white films
West German films
Anti-war films about World War II
Films about capital punishment
Films about miscarriage of justice
Films based on non-fiction books
Films directed by Kurt Meisel
Military courtroom films
World War II naval films
1950s German films